The Ghana Olympic Committee (GOC), formally known as Gold Coast Olympics Committee was established in 1950 and recognized the following year by International Olympic Committee. The Ghana Olympic Committee is committed to developing, organizing, and protecting Olympism or the Olympic Movement throughout the country. And ever since participating in the Summer Olympic Games in 1952 and the Commonwealth Games in 1954, during the Gold Coast period, the organization has been responsive to promoting the ideals of  both Games, with respect to the ordinances set fourth by the Olympic Charter as well as the constitution of the CGF .

History

Executive committee
 President: Ben Nunoo Mensah
 Vice Presidents: Paul Atchoe, Yeboah Evans, Nii Adote Din Barima I 
 Secretary General: Richard Akpokavie
 Deputy Secretary General: Richmond Quarcoo
 Treasurer: Frederick Lartey Otu
 Assistant Treasurer: Theophilus Wilson Edzie
 Members: Herbert Mensah, Emmanuel Nikoi, Leanier Afiyea-Obo Addy, Albert Frimpong, Isaac Duah, Joseph Kweku Ogah, Melvin Brown, George Owusu Ansaah, Mawuko Afadzinu, Jerry Ahmed Shaib

Logo

See also
Ghana at the Olympics
Ghana at the Commonwealth Games

References

External links
Official website

Ghana
Ghana
Ghana at the Olympics
Olympic
Sports organizations established in 1951
1951 establishments in Gold Coast (British colony)